The Panthers' flagship radio stations are WBT in Charlotte and WBT-FM in Chester, S.C. The announcing team consists of Mick Mixon, Jake Delhomme, and Jim Szoke. Most preseason games are locally broadcast by Charlotte's CW affiliate, WCCB channel 18.

Panthers radio announcers

 
Carolina Panthers
Broadcasters